The 1995 Estoril Open was a men's tennis tournament played on outdoor clay courts. This event was the 6th edition of the Estoril Open, and was included in the  World Series of the 1995 ATP Tour. The tournament took place at the Estoril Court Central, in Oeiras, Portugal, from April 3 through April 10, 1995. Third-seeded Thomas Muster won the singles title.

Finals

Singles

 Thomas Muster defeated  Albert Costa, 6–4, 6–2
It was Muster's 2nd singles title of the year and 25th of his career.

Doubles

 Yevgeny Kafelnikov /  Andrei Olhovskiy defeated  Marc-Kevin Goellner /  Diego Nargiso, 5–7, 7–5, 6–2

References

External links
Official tournament website

1995
Estoril Open
Estoril Open
Estoril Open
 Estoril Open